This is a list of Members elected to the Provisional Legislative Council at the 1996, held on 24 March.

Composition

List of Members
The following table is a list of LegCo members elected on 24 March 1996.

Key to changes since legislative election:
a = change in party allegiance
b = by-election

See also
 1996 Hong Kong Provisional Legislature election

References
 Hong Kong Yearbook 1997

 02
Provisional Legislative Council, members
20th-century Hong Kong people
1996 in Hong Kong
1990s in Hong Kong